Vasilenko is a Russian adaptation of the Ukrainian surname Vasylenko, derivative of a given name Vasyl.

People
Aleksandr Vasilenko (born 1986), Russian footballer
Dmitri Vasilenko (born 1975), Russian artistic gymnast
Ivan Vasilenko (1895–1966), Russian writer
Oleg Vasilenko (born 1973), Russian football manager
Sergei Vasilenko (1872–1956), Soviet Russian classical composer and conductor

Other
 Gennadiy Vassilenko, Soviet sprint canoer

See also
 Vasylenko
 
 

Russian-language surnames
Surnames of Ukrainian origin